Welch Peaks is a  elevation mountain located in the eastern Olympic Mountains in Jefferson County of Washington state. It is set within Buckhorn Wilderness, on land managed by the Olympic National Forest. The nearest higher neighbor is Mount Townsend,  to the north, and Mount Worthington rises  to the southwest. Precipitation runoff from Welch Peaks drains into tributaries of the Big Quilcene River, and Silver Creek which is a tributary of the Dungeness River. Topographic relief is significant as the summit rises 3,100 feet (945 m) above Townsend Creek in approximately one mile. The mountain's name was officially adopted in 1963 by the U.S. Board on Geographic Names.

Climate
Welch Peaks is located in the marine west coast climate zone of western North America. Most weather fronts originate in the Pacific Ocean, and travel northeast toward the Olympic Mountains. As fronts approach, they are forced upward by the peaks of the Olympic Range, causing them to drop their moisture in the form of rain or snowfall (Orographic lift). As a result, the Olympics experience high precipitation, especially during the winter months in the form of snowfall. During winter months, weather is usually cloudy, but, due to high pressure systems over the Pacific Ocean that intensify during summer months, there is often little or no cloud cover during the summer. Because of maritime influence, snow tends to be wet and heavy, resulting in avalanche danger.

Geology

The Olympic Mountains are composed of obducted clastic wedge material and oceanic crust, primarily Eocene sandstone, turbidite, and basaltic oceanic crust. The mountains were sculpted during the Pleistocene era by erosion and glaciers advancing and retreating multiple times.

Gallery

See also

 Geology of the Pacific Northwest
 Olympic Mountains

References

External links
 Weather forecast: Welch Peaks

Mountains of Washington (state)
Olympic Mountains
Landforms of Jefferson County, Washington
North American 1000 m summits